Oleksandr Zhdanov (born 27 May 1984) is a former professional Ukrainian-Israeli football defender.

Honours
Liga Leumit
Winner (1): 2016–17

External links

Profile on Football Squads

1984 births
Living people
Footballers from Kharkiv
Ukrainian Jews
Ukrainian footballers
Association football defenders
Ukrainian emigrants to Israel
FC Hazovyk-KhGV Kharkiv players
FC Lviv players
FC Knyazha Shchaslyve players
FC Kryvbas Kryvyi Rih players
FC Poltava players
FC Kolos Zachepylivka players
FC Slutsk players
Hapoel Beit She'an F.C. players
Bnei Sakhnin F.C. players
Maccabi Netanya F.C. players
FC Metalist 1925 Kharkiv players
FC Podillya Khmelnytskyi players
Ukrainian Premier League players
Liga Leumit players
Ukrainian First League players
Ukrainian expatriate footballers
Expatriate footballers in Belarus
Ukrainian expatriate sportspeople in Belarus